Mystrocnemis flavovittata is a species of beetle in the family Cerambycidae. It was described by Quedenfeldt in 1882. It is known from Angola.

References

Endemic fauna of Angola
Saperdini
Beetles described in 1882